Neddy Rose (born 31 May 1981) is a Seychellois football player. He is a central back defender on the Seychelles national football team.

See also
Football in Seychelles
List of football clubs in Seychelles

References

External links

1981 births
Living people
Seychellois footballers
Seychelles international footballers
Place of birth missing (living people)
Association football defenders
21st-century Seychellois people